Červená Lhota (German: Roth-Lhotta) a château in Červená Lhota village of the Pluhův Žďár municipality, in the South Bohemian Region, Czech Republic. It stands at the middle of a lake on a rocky island. Its picturesque Renaissance building is a destination of thousands of tourists every year. Its name Červená Lhota meaning "red lhota" can be explained by the colour of the château's bright-red roof tiles. There is also a park, where the Chapel of the Holy Trinity is located.

History

The existence of an original fortress on the site of today's château is assumed from sometime around the middle of the 14th century. It was built on a rocky granite outcrop, which, after the damming of a stream and the filling up of a fishpond, became an island. The first written source is an entry into the land records from 1465, mentioning the division of the property of deceased Ctibor of Zásmuk between his two sons Petr and Václav. The fortress then might have been sold into the ownership of Diviš Boubínský of Újezd, who sold it to the knightly family of Káb of Rybňan sometime around 1530. The family had the original Gothic castle rebuilt and the basic Renaissance remodelling carried out between 1542 and 1555, and the château acquired the name Nová Lhota. In 1597, the château was sold to Vilém Růt of Dírná who had the building rendered with red plaster, from which it got its name Červená Lhota. The last of the Ruts, Bohuslav, had to leave the Bohemian lands as an Utraquist after the 1620 Battle of White Mountain.

In 1621, Červená Lhota was inhabited by Antonio Bruccio, who died in 1639 without an heir. With his death, Lhota lost its function as a residence and it was used by his successors as occasional cottage. In 1641, it was acquired by aristocrat Vilém Slavat of Chlum and Košumberk and later it passed into the hands of the Windisch-Graetz family. Bedřich Arnošt Windisch-Graetz and his son Leopold dragged the dominion into great debts due to their out-dated style of economics, so the custodian of his under-aged successor Joseph Nicholas recommended the sale of the dominion. In 1755 the château then was obtained by the Barons of Gudenus. Franz de Paul, Baron of Gudenus, shortly afterwards initiated several constructions, which were brought to an abrupt halt in 1774 by a great fire, which destroyed essentially all agricultural buildings.

In 1776, Červená Lhota welcomed a new owner, Baron Ignác Stillfried, a progressive aristocrat of Prussian Silesia, who from 1796 accommodated the composer Carl Ditters von Dittersdorf at the castle. His son sold the dominion to Jakub Veith in 1820. His daughter Terezie sold the château again in 1835, this time into the princely hands of Heinrich Eduard von Schönburg-Hartenstein who gave the castle to his son Josef Alexander von Schönburg-Hartenstein. He died in 1937 and was buried into the newly built tomb, and thus spared the destructive events of the new war, which drew the curtains closed for the entire aristocratic history of Červená Lhota château.

After the confiscation of the château by the Czechoslovak state in 1946, a children's clinic was established here. However, a year later, the château was granted to a National Culture Commission, and in 1949 it was opened to the public.

Description

The four-winged two-storey château, with a small courtyard in the center, occupies the whole rock and juts into the fishpond. A stone bridge, built in 1622, links the château with the banks of the pond, replacing the original drawbridge. The interiors have an extensive collection of historic furniture, tiled stoves, pictures, porcelain and other items. The southern edge of the fishpond is covered in thick forest, which forms a backdrop to the château. On the northern side is a landscaped park where the Renaissance Chapel of the Holy Trinity is situated. A marked circular path trenches around the fishpond. Rowing across the fishpond is a pleasant diversion on a hot summer day, and boats can be hired near the château.

Gallery

References

External links

Červená Lhota on Flickr
Červená Lhota Privat impression of David Hajes

Jindřichův Hradec District
Renaissance architecture in the Czech Republic
Water castles
Castles in the South Bohemian Region
Museums in the South Bohemian Region
Historic house museums in the Czech Republic
National Cultural Monuments of the Czech Republic